Master Menace is a fictional character appearing in American comic books published by Marvel Comics. Two different versions of the character appear in two separate (but related) continuities, Squadron Supreme and Supreme Power. Both bear the real name of Dr. Emil Burbank, though the former character has the middle name of "Zebediah".

Master Menace is an analogue of Lex Luthor with elements of Doctor Doom. This Master Menace is a supergenius inventor and is gifted in numerous fields of physical science. He usually wears a suit of powered armor with an arsenal of built-in weapons, which enables him to fight superhumans on a more equal basis (especially his nemesis, Hyperion).

Publication history 
Master Menace first appeared in Thor #280 (Feb. 1979), and was created by Roy Thomas and Wayne Boring.

Fictional character biography

Squadron Supreme

Originally, Hyperion encountered Dr. Emil Burbank (a.k.a. Master Menace) on Earth-712 (sometimes called "Earth-S"). In his first appearance, he battles Hyperion while the hero was filming a movie directed by Burbank's brother, L.L. Burbank.

On this occasion, Burbank works with the evil Hyperion of the mainstream Marvel Universe Earth-616, and imprisons the visiting Thor. Burbank is taken captive but later found himself in an interdimensional vacuum as he attempted to escape confinement.

When the Squadron are rebuilding America after the devastation caused by the Overmind, Master Menace concentrated his efforts on conquering the Middle East. He gave shelter to three supervillains: Remnant, Pinball, and the Mink, sending them to Earth-616. He later supplied the Redeemers with a way to reverse the brainwashing technology of the Squadron.

In Squadron Supreme: Death of a Universe, Emil Burbank ages fifteen years after going into the 41st century with Scarlet Centurion to build a device to stop the Nth Man.

In Squadron Supreme: New World Order, Emil Burbank is an old man at the mercy of large, multi-national corporations and using the Squadron's own Utopia technologies.

Supreme Power

Emil Burbank is a man with many aliases and possibly the greatest intellect on the planet. He has doctoral degrees in biology, chemistry, metallurgy, psychology, economics and literature from three different universities. As a child, he sexually abused his older sister by drugging her unconscious with chemical compounds, eventually leaving her in a permanent catatonic state. At 18, his parents died in a car accident, which he arranged and boasts about even while trying to say it was an accident. Emil is noted for malicious and homicidal retribution against those he feels have wronged him. A school bully and a professor who accused him of cheating were both caught in fires started by Emil.

After Emil agrees to work for the government, General Alexander sends Emil, Nuke, Arcanna, and Shape to apprehend or destroy Hyperion. While fighting Hyperion, Arcanna's quantum powers, Nuke's radioactive blast, and Hyperion's flash vision combine to create an effect that sends them all to an alternate reality, where Hyperion and most of the other heroes wage war against Earth's governments, to "save" humanity. However, the "alternate" reality is actually their reality, only years in the future. Emil and Hyperion are the only two members of the Squadron aware of this information after the five are returned to the correct time stream.

Emil was to be on the covert operations team after Hyperion's return to America, but after Hyperion informs a reporter of the project and gives him a list of the super-humans working for the government, the U.S. President gives a press conference and announces the formation of Squadron Supreme.

The team is sent to Uganda to apprehend John M'Butu, a fast-rising tribal leader gifted with a powerful verbal suggestion ability, who calls himself the Voice. Burbank reveals that he has developed counter measures to defend himself from everyone on his team, except for Hyperion and Doctor Spectrum. Before Amphibian attacks him, he defeats her with a powder he designed to kill her by suffocation.

On a mission codenamed "Long Walk", to take down insurgents of the Ilam Province in Iran, Emil developed technology that disrupts the functionings of the inner ear, incapacitating the soldiers, who Emil then proceeded to shoot. After Edith Freiberg found a little girl whose mother had been stoned by relatives for the perceived dishonor of being raped, Edith, using Emil Burbank as a translator, finds the relatives and buries them up to their necks. She then gives the girl a steel bar with which to kill them. After "Long Walk", Emil Burbank is at the conference to act as a bodyguard.

Powers and abilities
Emil Burbank was recruited to the Squadron because he was tested by the military and found to have been exposed to the retrovirus that had been released from Hyperion's spacecraft and bestowed superhuman abilities on numerous people around the world. Even though Emil's enhanced intellect is a direct result of the retro-virus, Emil denies it, insisting that his genius is his own doing.

Though not displaying any physical super powers, Emil demonstrates that he can defend himself in combat situations by the use of certain types of technology.

References

External links
 Marvel Heroes Classic Roleplaying Game page on Master Menace
 Marvel.com page on Master Menace

Characters created by Roy Thomas
Comics characters introduced in 1979
Characters created by J. Michael Straczynski
Fictional inventors
Marvel Comics male supervillains
Marvel Comics scientists
Marvel Comics supervillains
Squadron Supreme